The 2017–18 Odense Boldklub season was the club's 129th season, and their 56th appearance in the Danish Superliga. As well as the Superliga, the side was also competing in the DBU Pokalen.

OB finished 10th overall in the Superliga. Due to another disappointing season, head coach Kent Nielsen got fired on May 21.

First team

Last updated on 31 January 2018

Transfers and loans

Transfers in

Transfers out

Competitions

Superliga

League table

Results summary

Results by round

Matches

Relegation round

European play-offs

Quarter-finals 

Odense lost 4–6 on aggregate

DBU Pokalen

Squad statistics

Goalscorers
Includes all competitive matches. The list is sorted by shirt number when total goals are equal.

Disciplinary record

References

Odense Boldklub season
Odense Boldklub seasons